Blue Cow is a cartoon cow created by Blue-Zoo. She originally appeared on the BBC children's television series The Story Makers before the episodes were reformatted as a standalone series. The show was primarily shown on the CBeebies channel but has been shown previously on BBC Two.

Blue Cow wonders what goes on in the outside world beyond her field. In each episode she wonders about something different. The other (black and white) cows in the field don't appear to have the same inquiring mind as Blue Cow as whenever she starts wondering they say, "she's off again." Blue Cow then boards a red double decker bus which takes her to an appropriate destination where she will find out the answer to what she was wondering about.

When she returns to her field at the end of most episodes she tells the other cows in the field what she has done during the day. The other cows invariably do not believe her and say, "Everyone knows cows can't ..." followed by a description of precisely what Blue Cow has just done, with the narrator usually following up the remark with "But we know they can, don't we?"

References

BBC children's television shows
Television series about cattle